Methanophenazine, a phenazine derivative, is a strongly hydrophobic redox-active cofactor with a role in electron transport in some methanogens. This chromophore can be purified from membranes of methanogenic archaea such as Methanosarcina mazei. The enzyme methanosarcina-phenazine hydrogenase (EC 1.12.98.3) has the name methanophenazine hydrogenase as a synonym.

References

Phenazines
Cofactors